Dominique Rakotorahalahy (born 3 August 1944) is a Malagasy athlete. He competed in the men's decathlon at the 1968 Summer Olympics.

References

1944 births
Living people
Athletes (track and field) at the 1968 Summer Olympics
Malagasy decathletes
Olympic athletes of Madagascar
People from Ambositra